The Wilbert T. Reed House is a historic house in Auburn, Nebraska. It was built in 1884 for Wilmer T. Reed, a settler from Ohio. Reed became a grocer in Auburn, then known as Sheridan, in 1875, only seven years after the town had been established. His house was designed in the Italianate architectural style. It has been listed on the National Register of Historic Places since March 24, 1980.

References

Houses on the National Register of Historic Places in Nebraska
National Register of Historic Places in Nemaha County, Nebraska
Italianate architecture in Nebraska
Houses completed in 1884